The 2016–17 Liga de Fútbol Profesional Boliviano season was the 40th season of Bolivia's top-flight football league and the last season under the LFPB name. This season comprised three tournaments (Apertura 2016, Apertura 2017 and Clausura 2017) after an agreement was reached between LFPB and ANF (Second Division) to change the calendar to a single calendar year following the reforms implemented for the Copa Libertadores and Copa Sudamericana by CONMEBOL ahead of the 2017 season.

Teams
The number of teams for 2016–17 remained the same as last season. Ciclón was relegated to the Liga Nacional B (Second Division). They were replaced by the 2015–16 Liga Nacional B champion Guabirá.

Torneo Apertura 2016

Standings

Results

Championship playoff
Since The Strongest and Bolívar ended up tied in points, a playoff was played to decide the champion.

Top goalscorers

Source: Soccerway

Torneo Apertura 2017

Standings

Results

Top goalscorers

Source: Soccerway

Torneo Clausura 2017

Standings

Results

Top goalscorers

Source: Soccerway

Aggregate table

Aggregate table playoff decider

Since Petrolero and Universitario ended the season tied in points, a match on neutral ground was played to determine the team that played the promotion/relegation playoff. The loser qualified for the promotion/relegation playoff.

Relegation/promotion playoff
The relegation playoff was played between:
 Petrolero (2016–17 Primera División aggregate table 12th place)
 Destroyers (2016–17 Liga Nacional B runners-up)

The winner played in the top flight for the 2018 season.

Destroyers won on points (4–1) and was promoted to the Primera División.

References

External links
 Official website of the LFPB 

2016
2016 in South American football leagues
2017 in South American football leagues
1